Dalton is a town in Coös County, New Hampshire, United States. The population was 933 at the 2020 census. It is part of the Berlin, NH–VT Micropolitan Statistical Area.

History 
 
Dalton was incorporated in 1764 under the name "Chiswick", named for the Duke of Devonshire's castle. The name was changed to "Apthorp" in 1770, after the Apthorp family. In 1784 Apthorp was divided into two towns, Littleton and Dalton.
The name "Dalton" was chosen in honor of Tristram Dalton, merchant and senator from Massachusetts.

Geography 
The town includes the hamlet of Cushman, located on the Connecticut River opposite Gilman, Vermont. Dalton lies fully within the Connecticut River watershed.

Approximately 82% of the town's land— out of a total land area of —is undeveloped farm land, forest land or unproductive land enrolled in the state's current use program.

Demographics 

As of the census of 2000, there were 927 people, 374 households, and 253 families living in the town.  The population density was 33.7 people per square mile (13.0/km2).  There were 520 housing units at an average density of 18.9 per square mile (7.3/km2).  The racial makeup of the town was 96.76% White, 0.76% African American, 0.54% Native American, 0.22% Asian, 0.22% from other races, and 1.51% from two or more races. Hispanic or Latino of any race were 1.94% of the population.

There were 374 households, out of which 28.9% had children under the age of 18 living with them, 56.1% were married couples living together, 6.7% had a female householder with no husband present, and 32.1% were non-families. 24.1% of all households were made up of individuals, and 13.4% had someone living alone who was 65 years of age or older.  The average household size was 2.48 and the average family size was 2.95.

In the town, the population was spread out, with 24.4% under the age of 18, 6.5% from 18 to 24, 27.2% from 25 to 44, 27.4% from 45 to 64, and 14.6% who were 65 years of age or older.  The median age was 41 years. For every 100 females, there were 106.0 males.  For every 100 females age 18 and over, there were 104.4 males.

The median income for a household in the town was $35,625, and the median income for a family was $41,667. Males had a median income of $29,097 versus $20,089 for females. The per capita income for the town was $16,234.  About 2.7% of families and 5.6% of the population were below the poverty line, including 6.3% of those under age 18 and 10.8% of those age 65 or over.

References

External links 

 New Hampshire Economic and Labor Market Information Bureau Profile

Towns in Coös County, New Hampshire
Berlin, New Hampshire micropolitan area
New Hampshire populated places on the Connecticut River
Towns in New Hampshire
1764 establishments in New Hampshire